Burlington Cedar Rapids and Northern Depot may refer to any railway station on the Burlington, Cedar Rapids and Northern Railway including:

Burlington, Cedar Rapids and Northern Railroad Passenger Station (Clarion, Iowa), listed on the National Register of Historic Places in Wright County, Iowa
Burlington, Cedar Rapids & Northern Passenger Depot-Dows, Iowa, listed on the National Register of Historic Places in Wright County, Iowa

Burlington Cedar Rapids and Northern Depot (Pipestone, Minnesota), listed on the National Register of Historic Places in Pipestone County, Minnesota

See also
Burlington Station (disambiguation)